Morenike Mojisola Olayemi Enobong Lasode (born 11 March 1993) better known by her stage name Marenikae, is an Atlanta-based Nigerian singer and songwriter.

Early life 
Marenikae was born and raised in Nigeria to a Yoruba and Krio father who is a musician, film director and producer and an Efik mother. After her secondary education, she relocated to Boston for her tertiary education, where she earned a degree in Crime and Justice studies from the University of Massachusetts.

Career 
Marenikae started singing at the age of 14. She began her professional music career in 2018, with the release of her debut single "Remember". In 2018, Marenikae released her debut studio album Ajebutter.

In 2022, she released the music video for "Deliverance (na so)" the lead single off her EP "Acquired Taste". She also released "As I Be", as the second single off the EP.

Discography

Albums

Singles

References 

Living people
21st-century Nigerian singers
1993 births
Nigerian singers
Nigerian singer-songwriters